Saint Honoratus of Amiens (Honoré, sometimes Honorius) (d. 16 January ca. 600) was the seventh bishop of Amiens.  His feast day is May 16. (Honoratus of Lérins (c. 350 – 429) was Archbishop of Arles.)

Hagiography
Honoratus was born in Port-le-Grand (Ponthieu) near Amiens to a noble family. Noting his pious inclinations, his family entrusted his education to his predecessor in the bishopric of Amiens, Saint Beatus (Beat). Honoratus resisted being elected bishop of Amiens, believing himself unworthy of this honour.

During his bishopric, he discovered the relics of Victoricus, Fuscian, and Gentian, which had remained hidden for 300 years.

Legend
The Vie de Saint-Honoré was composed towards the end of the 11th century by a canon of Amiens from ancient manuscripts and local legends. According to hagiographic tradition, a ray of light of divine origin descended upon his head upon his election as bishop.  There also appeared holy oil of unknown origin on his forehead.

When it was known in his hometown that he had been proclaimed bishop, his nursemaid, who was baking bread for the family, refused to believe that Honoratus had been elevated to such a position.  She remarked that she would believe the news only if the peel she had been using to bake bread put down roots and turned itself into a tree.  When the peel was placed into the ground, it was transformed into a mulberry tree that gave flowers and fruit. This miraculous tree was still being shown in the sixteenth century.

Veneration
His devotion was widespread in France following reports of numerous miracles when his body was exhumed in 1060.

After his death, his relics were invoked against drought and floods to ensure a good wheat harvest. Bishop Guy, son of Enguerrand I, Count of Ponthieu, ordered that a procession be held, in which an urn holding Honoratus' relics were carried around the walls of the city.

In 1202, a baker named Renold Theriens (Renaud Cherins) donated to the city of Paris some land to build a chapel in honor of the saint. The chapel became one of the richest in Paris, and gave its name to Rue du Faubourg Saint-Honoré.

In 1240, during construction of the cathedral of Amiens, the relics of Honoratus were carried through the surrounding countryside in a quest for funds. A statue of Honoratus stands in the southern portal of Amiens Cathedral.

Patronage

Saint Honoré is the patron of a Carthusian establishment at Abbeville, which was founded in 1306.

He is the patron saint of bakers and pastry chefs. In 1400, the bakers of Paris established their guild in the church of Saint Honoratus, celebrating his feast on 16 May and spreading his cult. In 1659, Louis XIV ordered that every baker observe the feast of Saint Honoratus, and give donations in honor of the saint and for the benefit of the community. The St. Honoré Cake is named for him.

Legacy

It is from him that a well-known church (Saint Honore) and thoroughfare in Paris, take their name.

Notes

References

External links
Saint of the Day, May 16: Honoratus of Amiens
 San Honorato
 Saint Honore, patron des boulangers
 Ὁ Ἅγιος Ὀνωράτος Ἐπίσκοπος Ἀμιένης. ΜΕΓΑΣ ΣΥΝΑΞΑΡΙΣΤΗΣ.

Bishops of Amiens
6th-century Frankish bishops
6th-century Frankish saints